Valeriy Petrovych Sydorenko (born 23 September 1976) is a Ukrainian former amateur boxer. He competed for his native country at the 2000 Olympics and later won the 2000 European Amateur Boxing Championships.

He is the twin brother of Volodymyr Sydorenko, who fought as a professional.

Olympic results
Sydorenko represented his native country at the 2000 Summer Olympics in Sydney, Australia. There he was stopped in the quarterfinals of the Men's Light Flyweight division by Cuba's eventual bronze medalist Maikro Romero.
His results were:
Defeated José Albuquerque (Brazil)
Defeated Suban Pannon (Thailand)
Lost to Maikro Romero (Cuba)

References
sports-reference

1976 births
People from Enerhodar
Living people
Ukrainian twins
Flyweight boxers
Boxers at the 2000 Summer Olympics
Olympic boxers of Ukraine
Twin sportspeople
Ukrainian male boxers
Sportspeople from Zaporizhzhia Oblast